Kim Min-hyeok (born 3 May 1996) is a South Korean professional baseball infielder who is currently playing for the Doosan Bears of the KBO League. His major position is first baseman and third baseman. Kim was selected 16th overall by the Doosan Bears in the 2015 KBO second draft (second round).

References

External links 

 Career statistics and player information from the KBO League
 Kim Min-hyeok at Doosan Bears Baseball Club

1996 births
Living people
Sportspeople from Gwangju
KBO League infielders
Doosan Bears players